Manzoor Ahmed Kakar is a Pakistani politician who has been a member of the Senate of Pakistan from January 2019 till March 2021 and again since March 2021. He was also a Member of the Provincial Assembly of Balochistan, from May 2013 to March 2018. He has also served as Provincial Minister of Revenue. He is currently holding the portfolio of General Secretary of the Balochistan Awami Party.

Early life and education
He was born on 1 May 1971 in Quetta.

He has a degree in Master of Arts and a degree in the Bachelor of Laws.  He is an advocate by profession.

Political career

He was elected to the Provincial Assembly of Balochistan as a candidate of Pashtunkhwa Milli Awami Party from Constituency PB-6 Quetta-VI in 2013 Pakistani general election. He received 18,062 votes and defeated a candidate of Jamiat Ulema-e Islam (F).

In March 2018, the Election Commission of Pakistan disqualified him as Member of the Provincial Assembly of Balochistan for crossing the floor.

References

Living people
Balochistan MPAs 2013–2018
1971 births